Wireless Application Protocol Bitmap Format (shortened to Wireless Bitmap and with file extension .wbmp)  is a monochrome graphics file format optimized for mobile computing devices. 

WBMP images are monochrome (black & white) so that the image size is kept to a minimum. A black pixel is denoted by 0 and a white pixel is denoted by 1.

Format of Wireless Bitmap Files

Notes

External links
 WAP WAE Specification
 Open Mobile Alliance

Open Mobile Alliance standards
Graphics file formats